Green Canyon is an area in the Gulf of Mexico that is rich in oil fields and under the jurisdiction of the Bureau of Ocean Energy Management. Among other oil fields Green Canyon consist of Atlantis (blocks 699, 700, 742, 743, and 744) operated by BP, Marco Polo (block 608) and K2 (blocks 518 and 562) operated by Anadarko Petroleum, Manatee (block 155) operated by Shell, Shenzi (blocks 609, 610, 653, and 654) operated by BHP, Droshky (block 244) operated by Marathon Oil, and Tahiti (blocks 596, 597, 640 and 641) operated by Chevron.

Block 185 of Green Canyon is known as Bush Hill and is a well known cold seep with a wide array of tube worms. This area was the first place in the Gulf of Mexico where gas hydrates were recovered in piston cores.

Additionally, like most of the Gulf of Mexico, there is a significant amount of salt tectonics.

Blocks in this protraction area are defined in  UTM zone 15 north in feet.

Climate 
As recorded by a station in Block 184, the air above Green Canyon has a tropical rainforest climate (Köppen climate classification Af), with warm winters and extremely oppressive summers and very low diurnal temperature variation year-round (especially in summer), expected for its location far from any landmasses. Experiencing the purest Gulf influences possible, Green Canyon's summer nighttime low temperatures are some of the highest on Earth for any non-arid location, at least counting those on land. Temperatures below freezing are unknown.

Precipitation is relatively evenly distributed throughout the year, peaking in late summer at the height of the hurricane season, having a secondary peak in winter, and reaching its nadir in late spring.

References

Submarine canyons of the Gulf of Mexico